This list of awards for young actors is an index to articles to describe awards given to young actors.

See also

 Lists of awards
 Lists of acting awards

References

 
Young actors